The 1927 Santa Clara Broncos football team was an American football team that represented Santa Clara University as an independent during the 1927 college football season. In their third season under head coach Adam Walsh, the Broncos compiled a 5–4–2 record and were outscored by opponents by a total of 143 to 137.

Schedule

References

Santa Clara
Santa Clara Broncos football seasons
Santa Clara Broncos football